Andrei Dmitriyevich Fedin (born 28 September 1970) is a Russian former professional footballer.

Club career
He made his professional debut in the Soviet Top League in 1988 for FC Lokomotiv Moscow. He played 1 game for FC Torpedo Moscow in the USSR Federation Cup.

Honours
Soviet Cup finalist: 1990.

References

1970 births
Footballers from Moscow
Living people
Soviet footballers
Russian footballers
Association football midfielders
FC Torpedo Moscow players
FC Lokomotiv Moscow players
Russian Premier League players
FC Shinnik Yaroslavl players
FC Arsenal Tula players